This is a list of prisons within Heilongjiang province of the People's Republic of China.

Sources 
 

Buildings and structures in Heilongjiang
Heilongjiang